Ale-8-One, known colloquially as Ale-8, is a regional ginger- and citrus-flavored soft drink, distributed primarily to brick and mortar retailers in Kentucky. Ale-8 could be described as a ginger Soda with a "kick". It is a ginger and citrus blend, containing less carbonation and fewer calories than conventional soda.

It is bottled by the Ale-8-One Bottling Company in Winchester, Kentucky.

History
The formula for Ale-8-One was developed by soda bottler G. L. Wainscott in the 1920s. Wainscott, who had been in the soda business in Winchester, Kentucky since 1902, had developed Roxa-Kola, his previous flagship product, in 1906. In creating the formula for Ale-8-One, Wainscott drew upon his knowledge of ginger-based recipes acquired in northern Europe.

Wainscott began bottling Ale-8-One in 1926. To choose a name for the drink, he sponsored a name-the-product contest. "A Late One" was chosen as the winning entry. The "Ale-8-One" name is a pun of the phrase suggesting that his product was "the latest thing" in soft drinks.

In 1935, Wainscott purchased a livery stable in Winchester and converted it to a bottling factory to expand his operation. Upon Wainscott's death in 1944, half of his company stock went to his wife; the other half was divided among his employees. When his wife died in 1954, her stock was left to her brother, Frank A. Rogers, Sr. Rogers bought the remaining company stock in 1962 and incorporated the Ale-8-One Bottling Company. He named his son, Frank Rogers, Jr., manager of the new company.

The Ale-8-One Bottling Company constructed a new plant in Winchester in 1965. It ceased production of Roxa-Kola in 1968, and by 1974, had halted production of all its other drinks to focus on Ale-8-One. The company remains under the control of the Rogers family.

Composition
The recipe for Ale-8 is a closely guarded family secret. Reportedly, only two executives—former company president Frank A. Rogers III and his oldest son, Fielding Rogers, the current president—know the exact composition.

In 2003, the company announced limited distribution of Diet Ale-8, its first new product since the introduction of the original Ale-8 in 1926. Diet Ale 8 contains 44 mg of caffeine and no sugars. The diet variety is sweetened with a mixture of acesulfame potassium and sucralose.  Caffeine Free Diet Ale 8 followed in March 2011. In addition to not having any caffeine, it is also sweetened with Splenda.

In 2018, Cherry Ale 8 was released, making it the first flavored Ale-8-One. It was first available exclusively in fountain drink form, then it became available in bottles.  In April 2019, Ale-8-One announced a new orange cream soda flavor to be available in early May of that year. In May of 2022, Blackberry Ale 8 was released to the public, in a bottled form.

Availability and distribution
For much of its history, Ale-8 was only available in central and eastern portions of Kentucky. In April 2001, the Ale-8-One Bottling Company expanded its distribution to areas of southern Ohio, and southern Indiana, through an agreement with Coca-Cola Enterprises. Later, distribution to eastern Tennessee and far western Virginia was added. It is also available in some parts of West Virginia.

In July 2015, Ale-8 announced plans to expand production into Indianapolis.

Nationwide distribution
In 2016, Cracker Barrel began distributing the drink nationwide in all of its locations. In 2017, The Fresh Market began distributing Ale-8 and Diet Ale-8 in their stores in the eastern and Midwestern United States.

See also
 Craft soda

References

Works cited

External links
 
 Review on BevNET.com
 Sauceman, Fred (September 30, 2005). "Kentucky's Ale-8-One Soon to Turn 80" WETS-fm Public Radio site.
 Lomax, Rebecca (July 18–24, 2002). "The Latest Thing." (Cincinnati) CityBeat.

Ginger ale
Citrus sodas
Kentucky cuisine
Products introduced in 1926
American soft drinks
Winchester, Kentucky
Cuisine of the Southern United States
Companies based in Kentucky